The Clockforth Movement is the 2002 debut album by alternative hip hop artist Penny.

Track listing

References

External links

2002 debut albums
Penny (rapper) albums